The 1993 Philippine Basketball Association (PBA) Commissioner's Cup was the second conference of the 1993 season. It started on June 13 and ended on September 7, 1993. The import-spiced tournament was named after the Commissioner's office when the league change its season-format starting with the All-Filipino as the year's opening show.

Format
The following format will be observed for the duration of the conference:
The teams were divided into 2 groups.

Group A:
Purefoods Oodles
San Miguel Beermen
Shell Helix Oilers
Sta. Lucia Realtors

Group B:
Alaska Milkmen
Ginebra San Miguel
7-Up Uncolas
Swift Mighty Meaty Hotdogs

Teams in a group will play against each other once and against teams in the other group twice; 11 games per team; Teams are then seeded by basis on win–loss records. Ties are broken among point differentials of the tied teams. Standings will be determined in one league table; teams do not qualify by basis of groupings.
The top five teams after the eliminations will advance to the semifinals.
Semifinals will be two round robin affairs with the remaining teams. Results from the elimination round will be carried over. A playoff incentive for a finals berth will be given to the team that will win at least five of their eight semifinal games.
The top two teams (or the top team and the winner of the playoff incentive) will face each other in a best-of-seven championship series. The next two teams will qualify for a best-of-five playoff for third place.

Elimination round

Team standings

Semifinals

Team standings

Cumulative standings

Semifinal round standings:

Second seed playoff

Third place playoffs

Finals

References

External links
 PBA.ph

Commissioner's Cup
PBA Commissioner's Cup